Amadou Sy Savané (born 16 May 1974) is a Guinean sprinter. He competed in the men's 200 metres at the 1992 Summer Olympics. His elder brother Mohamed Sy Savané is an Olympic middle-distance runner.

References

1974 births
Living people
Athletes (track and field) at the 1992 Summer Olympics
Athletes (track and field) at the 1996 Summer Olympics
Guinean male sprinters
Guinean male hurdlers
Olympic athletes of Guinea
Place of birth missing (living people)